Gabrje pri Jančah (in older sources also Gabrije) is a settlement in the hills east of Ljubljana in central Slovenia. It belongs to the City Municipality of Ljubljana. It is part of the traditional region of Lower Carniola and is now included with the rest of the municipality in the Central Slovenia Statistical Region.

Name
The name of the settlement was changed from Gabrje to Gabrje pri Jančah in 1953.

References

External links

Gabrje pri Jančah on Geopedia

Populated places in the City Municipality of Ljubljana
Sostro District